is the youngest child and only son of the Crown Prince and Crown Princess of Japan. He is the nephew of Emperor Naruhito and second in line to the throne after his father, Fumihito.

Preceding his birth, the ongoing Japanese imperial succession debate had resulted in some politicians holding a favorable view on rescinding agnatic primogeniture imposed by World War II allies on the constitution of Japan. However, once Hisahito was born in 2006 he became next in the line of succession following his father. Hisahito's cousin and Emperor Naruhito's only child Princess Aiko remains at present legally ineligible to inherit the throne, while debate about the possibility of having future empresses regnant continues.

Birth 

Hisahito was born at 08:27 JST (23:27 UTC) on 6 September 2006 at Aiiku Hospital, Tokyo. He was delivered by Caesarean section, two weeks early, after complications in the pregnancy.

Hisahito is the only son and youngest child of Fumihito, Prince Akishino, and Kiko, Princess Akishino. He has two older sisters, Mako Komuro and Princess Kako of Akishino. He was first seen in public on 15 September 2006, outside Aiiku Hospital.

Hisahito, the Prince's personal name, chosen by his father, means "serene and virtuous", according to the Imperial Household Agency. An alternative translation is "virtuous, calm, everlasting". 

Hisahito was the first male child born to the Imperial House of Japan since his father in 1965. In January 2007, the Prime Minister of Japan, Shinzō Abe, announced that he would drop an earlier proposal to alter the Imperial Household Law so as to allow females to inherit the throne. The proposal had been made on the basis of the fact that the brother and two sons of Emperor Akihito had, at the time, no sons of their own. Given Hisahito's birth, it now seems increasingly unlikely that the laws will be changed to allow Hisahito's cousin, Princess Aiko, daughter of the Emperor Naruhito, to become a reigning Empress and thus end the Japanese succession debate. The supporters of changes criticized the current law as it placed a burden on the few aging males old enough to perform royal duties as females left the family.

Education 

In the spring of 2010, Prince Hisahito began kindergarten at a school affiliated with Ochanomizu University in Tokyo; on 14 December 2012, the Imperial Household Agency announced he would enter Ochanomizu University Elementary School in April 2013 so he could be with many of his friends from kindergarten. The prince thus became the first member of the Imperial House of Japan to receive his education at a school other than Gakushūin Primary School, which is also in Tokyo. By his second year, he was reported to be doing well at school, helping to look after first-year pupils and playing with his friends. In April 2019, Hisahito was enrolled in Ochanomizu University Junior High School. Police reports indicate that there was an assassination attempt on him there in May 2019. In March 2021, he was awarded a second-place prize in the junior high student category of Kitakyushu's 12th Children's Nonfiction Literature Awards.

In August 2019, he accompanied his parents on an official visit to Bhutan.

Titles and styles 

Hisahito is styled as His Imperial Highness Prince Hisahito.

The mon represents the Japanese umbrella-pine tree (kōyamaki).

References

External links
 

2006 births
Living people
People from Tokyo
Japanese princes
Royal children
21st-century Japanese people